State Road 174 (NM 174), also known as Cat Walk Road, is a  state highway in Catron County, New Mexico, United States, that connects U.S. Route 180 (US 180) in Glenwood with the Catwalk Recreation Area (southwest of Mogollon).

Route description

History

Major intersections

See also

 List of state roads in New Mexico

References

External links

174
Transportation in Catron County, New Mexico